Someone: A Novel, is the seventh book of fiction by American author Alice McDermott. Published by Farrar, Straus and Giroux in 2013, it was a finalist for both the National Book Award and the National Book Critics Circle Award.

Critical reception
Writing in the New York Times, Janet Maslin praised the novel, stating “Someone” is a wonderfully modest title for such a fine-tuned, beautiful book filled with so much universal experience, such haunting imagery, such urgent matters of life and death.” Maslin later named Someone to her best of 2013 books list.
Publishers Weekly called the book a “… deceptively simple tour de force.”
The Los Angeles Times claimed, “Just as McDermott manages to write lyrically in plain language, she is able to find the drama in uninflected experience.”

References

Novels set in New York City
2013 American novels
Farrar, Straus and Giroux books